Nasi kuning (Indonesian for: "yellow rice"), or sometimes called nasi kunyit (Indonesian for: "turmeric rice"), is an Indonesian fragrant rice dish cooked with coconut milk and turmeric, hence the name nasi kuning (yellow rice). 

In the Philippines, a related dish exists in Mindanao, particularly among the Maranao people, where it is known as kuning. Like the Indonesian version, it primarily uses turmeric, but also adds lemongrass and does not use coconut milk. A similar dish is also found in Sri Lankan cuisine where it is known as kaha buth (and Lamprais) and draws from both Indonesian and Sri Lankan influences.

Cultural significance
In Indonesian culture, nasi kuning has favourable symbolic meanings. The yellow-coloured rice is perceived to look like a pile of gold, so it is often served in festive occasions; including parties, housewarmings, welcoming guests and opening ceremonies – as a symbol of good fortune, prosperity, wealth and dignity.

Nasi kuning is quite widespread and commonly found in Indonesian culture. It can be found from Java to Sumatra, Bali and Sulawesi. However, it is most strongly associated with Javanese and Minahasa traditions. In Java, nasi kuning might come in the form of a cone called a tumpeng and is usually eaten during special events. The top of the tumpeng is customarily given to the most senior person in attendance. One of the most popular nasi kuning variants comes from Manado in North Sulawesi, which employs cakalang (skipjack tuna).

Ingredients and serving
The addition of turmeric and coconut milk, sometimes also includes pandan and lemongrass during the rice cooking and steaming process, has contributed to a tempting colour, pleasant fragrance, soft texture and a flavourful taste of the yellow rice. Certain spices such as cinnamon, cardamom, cloves and bay leaves, might be added to enhance this aromatic fragrant rice dish.

Nasi kuning is usually served with a variety of side dishes such as shredded omelette, serundeng (relish of grated coconut and spices), urap (vegetable in shredded coconut dressing), teri kacang (fried anchovy and peanuts), sambal goreng (fried tempeh and potato caramelised in spicy sauce), ayam goreng (Javanese-style fried chicken), balado udang (shrimp in chilli), or perkedel (potato fritters). More elaborate nasi kuning might include fried cow's brain, fried cow's lung, beef and seafood. It is common to serve nasi kuning with kerupuk udang (shrimp cracker) or emping chips and a decoratively cut cucumber and tomato.

See also

List of rice dishes
Nasi bogana
Nasi campur
Nasi goreng
Nasi kucing
Nasi lemak
Nasi liwet
Nasi pecel
Nasi tim
Nasi uduk
Nasi ulam

References

External links
 Nasi Kuning recipe
 

Indonesian rice dishes
Sri Lankan cuisine
Malaysian cuisine